Mika Špiljak ( or ; 28 November 1916 – 18 May 2007) was a Croatian politician who spent most of his political career as a member of the League of Communists of Yugoslavia in the SFR Yugoslavia.

Early years
He was born in Odra Sisačka (part of Sisak), in the Kingdom of Croatia-Slavonia (present-day Croatia). His father Dragutin was  a railway worker. Špiljak began working at the age of 16. He joined the Communist Party in 1938 and fought with Partisans during World War II.

Career
From 1949 to 1950, he was the mayor of Zagreb.

In 1963, Špiljak was appointed the Chairman of the Executive Council of Croatia and served until his 1967 appointment as the President of the Federal Executive Council, Yugoslavia's Prime Minister. He served in that capacity until 1969.

Špiljak then served as President of the collective Presidency of Yugoslavia from 1983 until 1984. While holding this office, Špiljak opened the 1984 Winter Olympics.

He was subsequently elected President of the Central Committee of the League of Communists of Croatia from 1984 until 1986.

Death
He died in 2007 at the age of 90. He was cremated in Zagreb.

In the 2000s (decade), German courts linked Špiljak to the assassination of Croatian emigrant Stjepan Đureković in 1983. After the hearings in Germany, all the links connecting him to the assassination were dropped.

References

Further reading
 

1916 births
2007 deaths
People from Sisak
People from the Kingdom of Croatia-Slavonia
League of Communists of Croatia politicians
Presidents of the Federal Executive Council of Yugoslavia
Presidents of the Executive Council of the Socialist Republic of Croatia
Mayors of Zagreb
Recipients of the Order of the People's Hero
Presidency of the Socialist Federal Republic of Yugoslavia members
Burials at Mirogoj Cemetery
Recipients of the Order of the Hero of Socialist Labour